Baciu is a Romanian surname. Notable people with the surname include:

Camil Baciu (1926–2005), Romanian journalist and science fiction writer
Catalin Baciu (born 1988), Romanian basketball player
Diana Baciu (born 1994), Moldovan chess champion
Eugen Baciu (born 1980), Romanian football player
Ioana Baciu (born 1990), Romanian female volleyball player
Ion Baciu (born 1944), Romanian wrestler
Maria Baciu (born 1942), Romanian poet
Marius Baciu (born 1975), Romanian footballer
Ștefan Baciu (1918–1993), Romanian poet
Tinel Baciu (born 1968), Romanian footballer for Politehnica Iași

Romanian-language surnames